The Boat Show was a Brisbane-based band that formed early 2000 with Matthew Strong of Custard & Martin Lee of Regurgitator after Custard disbanded and Martin left Regurgitator. 
Glenn Lewis was lead vocal & bass, John Canniffe guitar & vocal.

One EP was recorded, which was released on 18 July 2000.

References

Musical groups from Brisbane